The Theatre Museum in Warsaw is gathering collections related to the history of Polish and foreign theatres.

In 1957-1966 it operated as a branch of the Warsaw Historical Museum. Since 1965 it has been operating in the building and structure of the Grand Theatre, in interiors designed by Mieczysław Piprek. The museum was co-founded by Ewa Jeglińska. 

The museum conducts activities related to the collection and development, exhibition and educational activities. The museum's collection consists of tens of thousands of objects (both museology and archives) and is divided into a number of departments: sculpture, painting, drawing and graphic arts, souvenirs (related to outstanding people of the theatre), stage designs, costumes, photographs, records, manuscripts and documents, posters, programs, compact prints, continuous prints, notes, negatives. The museum also has several thematic archives: Archives of the Polish Theatre, Leon Schiller, Juliusz Osterwa, Jacek Woszczerowicz, Tadeusz Łomnicki, and the STS Theatre Archives.

Sources
 J. Szczublewski, Teatr Wielki w Warszawie 1833-1993, Warszawa 1993

References

External links
 
 Polish National Opera at Google Cultural Institute

Museums in Warsaw
Theatre museums
Theatres in Warsaw
1957 establishments in Poland
Theatres completed in 1957
Museums established in 1957